is a passenger railway station located in the city of Sōka, Saitama, Japan, operated by the private railway operator Tōbu Railway. Opened in 1962, the station was formerly known as Matsubaradanchi Station until it was renamed in April 2017.

Lines
Dokkyodaigakumae Station is served by the Tōbu Skytree Line, and is 19.2 kilometers from the terminus of the line at Asakusa Station in Tokyo.

Station layout
The station has one elevated island platform with two tracks. The station building is located underneath the platforms. There are two additional tracks for non-stop trains to bypass this station.

Platforms

History
The station opened on 1 December 1962 named . It was rebuilt as an elevated station in 1992.

From 17 March 2012, station numbering was introduced on all Tōbu lines, with Matsubaradanchi Station becoming "TS-17".

On 1 April 2017, the station was renamed "Dokkyodaigaku-mae (Soka-Matsubara)" to reflect its closeness to Dokkyo University and also the Soka Matsubara Walking Trail.

Passenger statistics
In fiscal 2019, the station was used by an average of 59,443 passengers daily.

Surrounding area
 Sōka Matsubara Housing Estate
 Dokkyo University
 Matsubaradanchi Post Office
 Saiyu Soka Hospital

See also
 List of railway stations in Japan

References

External links

  

Railway stations in Japan opened in 1962
Tobu Skytree Line
Stations of Tobu Railway
Railway stations in Saitama Prefecture
Sōka